Beano may refer to:

Arts and entertainment
 Beano, another name for the American version of Bingo, a game of chance
 Beano, a character on the American television sitcom Out of This World
 The Beano, a British children's comic featuring mainly humour
 The Beano Album, colloquial name for Blues Breakers with Eric Clapton, a 1966 album by John Mayall and the Bluesbreakers

People
 Beano Cook (1931–2012), ESPN sports commentator
 Brian McDonald (Gaelic footballer) (born 1980), Gaelic footballer nicknamed "Beano"

Other uses
 Beano (dietary supplement), used to prevent flatulence
 Beanos, a former second-hand record shop, once the largest in Europe, located in Croydon, England
 T13 Beano Grenade, an experimental hand grenade
 Beano, short for bean-feast, a British colloquial term for an excursion or celebration with food and drink

See also
 Stirling Albion F.C., nicknamed the Binos